SM UB-51 was a German Type UB III submarine or U-boat in the German Imperial Navy during World War I. She was commissioned into the Pola Flotilla of the German Imperial Navy on 26 July 1917 as SM UB-51.
 
She operated as part of the Pola Flotilla based in Cattaro. UB-51 was surrendered 16 January 1919 with the remainder of the Pola Flotilla following orders by Admiral Reinhard Scheer to return to port. UB-51 was later broken up at Swansea.

Construction

UB-51 was ordered by the GIN on 20 May 1916. She was built by Blohm & Voss, Hamburg and following just under a year of construction, launched at Hamburg on 8 March 1917. UB-51 was commissioned later that same year under the command of Kptlt. Ernst Krafft. Like all Type UB III submarines, UB-51 carried 10 torpedoes and was armed with a  deck gun. UB-51 had a displacement of  while surfaced and  when submerged. Her engines enabled her to travel at  when surfaced and  when submerged.

Summary of raiding history

References

Notes

Citations

Bibliography 

 

German Type UB III submarines
World War I submarines of Germany
U-boats commissioned in 1917
1917 ships
Ships built in Hamburg